Hosbond is a surname mostly found in Denmark but have been found in outside the border of Denmark. Hosbond comes from the Danish world husbond which mean a man of superior status compared to servants, employees, etc. e.g. farmer in an agricultural or lord of a manor but originally it had the same meaning as bonde meaning peasant and also meaning residents man (boende mand).

References

Danish-language surnames